Gerardo Huidobro Sigismondi (born 28 June 1996) is a Peruvian swimmer who has won several national and international medals at junior level. He has also participated in the FINA world championships in Dubai, United Arab Emirates, in 2013 and he has had several gold medals and records at the South American Junior Championships. In 2015 he started his collegiate career at Albion College, and he has won several individual gold medals at the Michigan Intercollegiate Athletic Association.

References
https://www.gobrits.com/sports/mswimdive/2016-17/bios/huidobro_gerardo_ry46?view=bio 

https://swimswam.com/brazil-completes-south-american-youth-championships-victory/

 https://web.archive.org/web/20120312002939/http://www.ipd.gob.pe/index.php/federaciones/m-s/natacion/1924-nadadores-lograron-cuatro-medallas-en-el-xvi-torneo-internacional-chico-piscina-mococa-2010

Peruvian male swimmers
1996 births
Living people
Swimmers at the 2011 Pan American Games
Swimmers at the 2015 Pan American Games
Pan American Games competitors for Peru
21st-century Peruvian people